Inquisitor alabaster is a species of sea snail, a marine gastropod mollusk in the family Pseudomelatomidae, the turrids and allies.

Description
The length of the shell varies between 30 mm and 40 mm.

The turreted shell is snowy white, sometimes faintly rose-tinged. It is longitudinally ribbed, with very fine revolving grooves and striae. It is somewhat depressed next the suture. The sinus is broad.

Distribution
This marine species occurs off the Philippines and in the China Seas.

References

 Reeve, Lovell. Conchologia Iconica: Or, Illustrations of the Shells of Molluscous Animals: I. Reeve, 1843.
 Liu J.Y. [Ruiyu] (ed.). (2008). Checklist of marine biota of China seas. China Science Press. 1267 pp.

External links
 
 
 Brazier, J. 1876. A list of the Pleurotomidae collected during the Chevert expedition, with the description of the new species. Proceedings of the Linnean Society of New South Wales 1: 151–162

alabaster
Gastropods described in 1843